Daniel Muñoz-de la Nava and  Sergio Pérez-Pérez won the final against Franko Škugor and Ivan Zovko 6–4, 6–1.

Seeds

Draw

Draw
{{16TeamBracket-Compact-Tennis3-Byes
| RD1=First round
| RD2=Quarterfinals
| RD3=Semifinals
| RD4=Finals

| RD1-seed03= 
| RD1-team03= D Blömke C Paar
| RD1-score03-1=7
| RD1-score03-2=62
| RD1-score03-3=[6]
| RD1-seed04= 
| RD1-team04= F Škugor I Zovko
| RD1-score04-1=64
| RD1-score04-2=7
| RD1-score04-3=[10]

| RD1-seed05=3
| RD1-team05= I Cervantes-Huegun C Poch-Gradin
| RD1-score05-1=7
| RD1-score05-2=64
| RD1-score05-3=[10]
| RD1-seed06= 
| RD1-team06= F Krajinović A Veić
| RD1-score06-1=5
| RD1-score06-2=7
| RD1-score06-3=[2]

| RD1-seed07= 
| RD1-team07= M Copil V Crivoi
| RD1-score07-1=6
| RD1-score07-2=3
| RD1-score07-3=[10]
| RD1-seed08= 
| RD1-team08= D Turner B Knittel
| RD1-score08-1=2
| RD1-score08-2=6
| RD1-score08-3=[5]

| RD1-seed09= 
| RD1-team09= A Michon G Rufin
| RD1-score09-1=w/o
| RD1-score09-2= 
| RD1-score09-3= 
| RD1-seed10= 
| RD1-team10= A Balázs D Lojda
| RD1-score10-1= 
| RD1-score10-2= 
| RD1-score10-3= 

| RD1-seed11= 
| RD1-team11=
| RD1-score11-1=3
| RD1-score11-2=6
| RD1-score11-3=[10]
| RD1-seed12=4
| RD1-team12= I Belyaev C Gârd
| RD1-score12-1=6
| RD1-score12-2=4
| RD1-score12-3=[2]

| RD1-seed13= 
| RD1-team13= P Červenák G Olaso
| RD1-score13-1=7
| RD1-score13-2=7
| RD1-score13-3= 
| RD1-seed14= 
| RD1-team14= P Luncanu F Mergea
| RD1-score14-1=6
| RD1-score14-2=5
| RD1-score14-3= 

| RD1-seed15= 
| RD1-team15= R Bautista-Agut E Carril
| RD1-score15-1=6
| RD1-score15-2=6
| RD1-score15-3= 
| RD1-seed16=2
| RD1-team16= I Anikanov A Smirnov
| RD1-score16-1=4
| RD1-score16-2=3
| RD1-score16-3= 

| RD2-seed01=1
| RD2-team01= M Fischer P Oswald
| RD2-score01-1=w/o
| RD2-score01-2= 
| RD2-score01-3= 
| RD2-seed02= 
| RD2-team02= F Škugor I Zovko
| RD2-score02-1= 
| RD2-score02-2= 
| RD2-score02-3= 

| RD2-seed03=3
| RD2-team03= I Cervantes-Huegun C Poch-Gradin
| RD2-score03-1=6
| RD2-score03-2=76
| RD2-score03-3=[6]
| RD2-seed04= 
| RD2-team04= M Copil V Crivoi
| RD2-score04-1=3
| RD2-score04-2=7
| RD2-score04-3=[10]

| RD2-seed05= 
| RD2-team05= A Balázs D Lojda
| RD2-score05-1=1
| RD2-score05-2=1
| RD2-score05-3= 
| RD2-seed06= 
| RD2-team06=
| RD2-score06-1=6
| RD2-score06-2=6
| RD2-score06-3= 

| RD2-seed07= 
| RD2-team07= P Červenák G Olaso
| RD2-score07-1=6
| RD2-score07-2=6
| RD2-score07-3= 
| RD2-seed08= 
| RD2-team08= R Bautista-Agut E Carril
| RD2-score08-1=4
| RD2-score08-2=4
| RD2-score08-3= 

| RD3-seed01= 
| RD3-team01= F Škugor I Zovko
| RD3-score01-1=3
| RD3-score01-2=6
| RD3-score01-3=[10]
| RD3-seed02= 
| RD3-team02= M Copil V Crivoi
| RD3-score02-1=6
| RD3-score02-2=3
| RD3-score02-3=[5]

| RD3-seed03= 
| RD3-team03=

References
Main Draw

Arad Challenger - Doubles
2010 Doubles